La Popolarissima is a one-day cycling race held annually in Veneto, Italy. It is part of UCI Europe Tour in category 1.2.

Winners

References

Cycle races in Italy
UCI Europe Tour races
Recurring sporting events established in 1919
1919 establishments in Italy